The Santa Margarita de Cortona Asistencia  was established in 1787 as an asistencia ("sub-mission") to Mission San Luis Obispo de Tolosa, then in the Spanish Las Californias Province.  Its site is near the present day city of Santa Margarita, in San Luis Obispo County, central California.

History
The asistencia compound was located north of the mission and of Cuesta Grade, in the Santa Lucia Mountains, on a site Padre Junípero Serra had previously chosen in 1772. It was named for Saint Margaret of Cortona, an Italian saint.  It was established for Indian Reductions of the large number of Salinan (Obispeño) Californian Indians, whose southern homeland included the area. The compound also served as an outpost, chapel, and storehouse.

The adobe and stone chapel building measured , with a chapel and eight auxiliary rooms for the use of the majordomo, his servants, and as quarters for visiting priests. One chamber functioned as a granary for storing mission crops.  The Mission Indians were engaged in extensive grain cultivation in the fields around it.

When the French privateer Hipólito Bouchard raided coastal colonial Alta California settlements in November 1818, many local residents sought refuge at this inland site.

Rancho period
The Santa Margarita Asistencia was secularized along with Mission San Luis Obispo in 1835, and suffered the same neglect that many mission properties did after that time. In 1841, the Mexican land grant for Rancho Santa Margarita was issued to Joaquín Estrada. After the two-day American capture of Monterey in 1842, General Pío Pico and General José Castro met at the rancho to discuss strategy. During the 1846 Bear Flag Revolt, the forces of Captain John C. Frémont captured an Indian bearing a message at the rancho, from Jose Jesus Pico, the Mexican Pueblo of San Luis Obispo Justice of the Peace, and ordered his execution.  In December of that year Frémont also arrested Estrada and others at the rancho, releasing them only after securing their pledges of service to Frémont.

Estrada sold Rancho Santa Margarita in 1861 to Mary and Martin Murphy Jr., who had come to Alta California with the Stephens-Townsend-Murphy Party in 1844.  The Murphys turned over running of the rancho, along with the adjacent Rancho Atascadero and Rancho Asuncion they also owned, to their son Patrick W. Murphy. He later served in the California Assembly and the California State Senate, and was a General in the California National Guard. Murphy erected a barn over the adobe and stone Santa Margarita de Cortona Asistencia to shield it from the elements.

In February 1889, the town of Santa Margarita was incorporated.

Present day
The Santa Margarita de Cortona Asistencia site is a California Historical Landmark. Several of the original stone walls remain standing, having been incorporated into a ranch barn. The site is on the private property of the Santa Margarita Ranch. Tours are occasionally offered, and the site may also be visited during some public Ranch events.

See also
 List of Spanish missions in California
 California Historical Landmarks in San Luis Obispo County, California
 Mission San Luis Obispo de Tolosa

Notes

References

External links

 Missiontour.org: Santa Margarita de Cortona Asistencia
 Santa Margarita Historical Society

Spanish missions in California
1787 in Alta California
Churches in San Luis Obispo County, California
California Historical Landmarks
1787 establishments in Alta California
Religious organizations established in 1787
History of San Luis Obispo County, California
Santa Lucia Range